FOMA SH906i is a mobile phone developed by Sharp for NTT DoCoMo using the FOMA（HSDPA） 3G network.

Features
The SH906i is only available in the Japanese market. It is the first ClearPad enabled touchscreen mobile phone to be introduced to Japan's mobile handset market.
Similar to the SH905i, it has a screen that can flip 180 degrees to face opposite from the user. The overall look of the phone closely resembles that of a SH903i.

The screen is a 3.0" TFT LCD unit capable of representing 16.7 million colors at 854X480 resolution. It also sports a strengthened form of anti-peek technology whereby a press of a button activates patterns across the screen when viewed at an angle.

The lid can be folded down while the screen is flipped outwards, enabling the touch screen feature of this phone. The screen itself users capacitive screen, hence it is not possible to use a stylus. Users in Japan can use the phone in this mode to browse the web, watch 1SEG terrestrial TV, and control the camera.

The directional key now contains a sensor integrating Sharp's exclusive "Touch Cruiser" technology. This allows users to navigate the menus akin to using a laptop touch pad. The settings allow for multiple sensitivity options as well as an option to turn it off altogether.

The camera has been upgraded to a 5.2MP CMOS unit with AutoFocus for up to 5 faces. It features anti-shake technology, automatic white balance and a panoramic mode. However, the handset does not feature a secondary camera. For 3G calls, it is still possible to use the primary camera by swiveling the lid 180 degrees.

Bluetooth is built in, a first for FOMA Sharp handsets. However it is limited to headset pairing only.

Preinstalled i-アプリ (i-Appli)
 Japanese-English translator for SH
 Japanese-Chinese translator for SH
 Web Dictionary
 GPS
 TV Remote
 DCMX Mobile Wallet Service
 FeliCa
 Devil May Cry for SH
 Google Mobile Maps
 Manga/Book Reader

See also
List of Sharp mobile phones
NTT docomo - dominant carrier

References

External links
 FOMA SH906i - NTTドコモ
 SH906i - シャープ
 ケータイ新製品SHOW CASE SH906i - ケータイWatch

Sharp Corporation mobile phones
Nippon Telegraph and Telephone